Tan Sri Azman bin Hashim (born 17 July 1939), is a Malaysian investor who is one of the richest people in Malaysia and his net worth was estimated by Forbes to be US$600 million in 2006.

Early life
Tan Sri Azman Hashim was born on 17 July 1939 in Kuala Lumpur to a family of thirteen siblings and spent his childhood in Kampung Baru, Kuala Lumpur. His father was a strict disciplinarian and his mother was a school teacher who later became headmistress of the Kampung Baru Girls’ School. In 1954, he sat for the Senior Cambridge Examination and obtained a first grade. He was offered accountancy on a Colombo Plan Scholarship which took him to Australia from 1955 to 1960. He became a Chartered Accountant and Chartered Secretary before the age of 21. He became a Fellow of both the Chartered Institute of Accountants, Australia (FCA Australia) and the Institute of Chartered Secretaries & Administrators (FCIS) in 1960. Later he also became a Fellow of the Institute of Bankers, Malaysia, the Institute of Directors, Malaysia and the Malaysian Institute of Management.

Career
Azman Hashim is a corporate figure. His experience began in Perth, Australia where he was employed by Messrs O.L. Haines & Co (Chartered Accountants) from 1955-1960. In 1960, he returned to serve with Bank Negara Malaysia until May 1964 when he left to start his own accountancy practice of Azman & Co which later grew into a partnership, Azman Wong Salleh & Co (Chartered Accountants). He then joined the Board of Malayan Banking Berhad in 1966 and was its Executive Director from 1971 to 1980. He was appointed Executive Chairman of Kwong Yik Bank Berhad in 1980 until 1982 when he became Chairman of the AmBank Group until today. Currently, Tan Sri Dato’ Azman Hashim is Executive Chairman of Amcorp Group Berhad and Chairman of several subsidiaries of the AmBank Group and also Amcorp Properties Berhad.

Azman is Chairman of the
Malaysian Investment Banking Association
National Productivity Corporation
Pacific Basin Economic Council International(PBEC)
Non-Aligned Movement's (NAM) Business Council
Institute of Bankers Malaysia (IBBM)
Co-Chairman of Malaysia-Singapore Roundtable
Co-Chair, United Nations Economic and Social Commission for Asia and the Pacific (UNESCAP) Business Advisory Council
Board of Trustees, Perdana Leadership Foundation

and President of
Malaysia South-South Corporation Berhad
Malaysia-Japan Economic Association
Malaysia South-South Association
Friends of Prisons Association

He is also a Member of the
National Economic Consultative Council II (MAPEN II)
Business Advisory Council of APEC (”ABAC”)
The Trilateral Commission (Asia-Pacific Group)
Board of Advisors, AIM Centre for Corporate Social Responsibility
Malaysia-British Business Council
Malaysia-China Business Council
International Advisory Panel, Bank Negara Malaysia
International Centre for Education in Islamic Finance (INCEIF)
International Advisory Panel, World Islamic Economic Forum
Leader of the ASEAN-Japanese Business Meeting (Malaysia Committee, Keizai Doyukai)

He also serves as the Treasurer for the Malaysia-US Private Sector Consultative Group and the Malaysia-Australia Foundation and also Vice-Chairman of the Malaysian Business Council and one of the Governors of the Japanese Chamber of Trade and Industry (JACTIM) Malaysia Foundation. He is also one of the trustees for Malaysian Liver Foundation, Better Malaysia Foundation, ECM Libra Foundation in addition to the AmGroup Foundation. Azman Hashim sits on the Board of Directors for the Asian Institute of Finance.

Recognition
Azman Hashim has been awarded numerous honours. His first award was the Darjah ”Kesatria Mangku Negara”, by His Majesty Yang DiPertuan Agong in 1972; His Royal Highness the Sultan of Selangor honoured him with the ”Darjah Dato’ Paduka Mahkota Selangor" (DPMS) in 1980 which carried the title Dato’; this was followed by the ”Johan Mahkota Negara” (JMN) awarded by His Majesty Yang DiPertuan Agong in 1984. The Asian Finance magazine named him ”Asia’s Banker of the Year” in 1985. This was followed by His Majesty Yang DiPertuan Agong awarding him the ”Darjah Panglima Setia Mahkota” (PSM) in 1988 which bestowed on him the title ”Tan Sri”.

In 1993, the ASEAN Business Forum (formerly known as the ASEAN Institute) presented him with the ”ASEAN Businessman of the Year” award. This was followed in 1995 by the ”Manager of the Year” award from the Harvard Business School Alumni Club of Malaysia. The Kuala Lumpur Malay Chamber of Commerce awarded him with the ”Grand Entrepreneurial Award” in June 1996 and a year later he received the ”Menteri Besar Grand Entrepreneurial Award” from the Selangor Chamber of Commerce in 1997. The "Academy Values for Life Excellence” was awarded for his humanitarian contribution in 2004.  He received a lifetime achievement award, at 4th Annual Islamic Business and Finance Awards 2009.

He is an Honorary Officer of the Order of Australia.

Personal life
He married Tunku Arishah Tunku Maamor on 3 March 1963 and has two sons, three daughters and ten grandchildren. One of his daughters is a former local artist, Shazrina or popularly known as Mizz Nina.

References

External links
Forbes Asia
Amcorp Group Berhad
Amcorp Properties Berhad
Open University Malaysia

1939 births
Living people
Malaysian people of Malay descent
Malaysian Muslims
Malaysian businesspeople
People from Kuala Lumpur
Honorary Officers of the Order of Australia
Officers of the Order of the Defender of the Realm
Companions of the Order of the Defender of the Realm
Commanders of the Order of Loyalty to the Crown of Malaysia
Malaysian chairpersons of corporations
Knights Commander of the Order of the Crown of Selangor